Algerian Muslim Scouts (SMA; in , in ) is the national Scouting association in Algeria. SMA has 24,750 members as of 2011.

History 

Scouting in Algeria began formatively around 1911, but Scouting was officially founded in French Algeria in 1935, introduced by Algerian Scouter  with a troop in Algiers called the "al Falah". Other sections then united with them: in Miliana the section "Ibn Khaldoun", and others in Constantine, Mostaganem, Blida, Sétif, Tizi Ouzou, Batna and Guelma.

With the proposal of Bouras, the league of the scouts Moslem Algerian was created and obtained the approval of the government of the Popular front in July 1939. Encouraged by Oulémas reformists, the movement propagated patriotic ideas, was guided by nationalist chiefs, and carried out many demonstrations, like that of May 8, 1945, during which Bouzid Chaal, a young scout, died. Many scouts then took part in the war of independence, with the call of the mujaheddin.

Algeria became a member of the World Organization of the Scout Movement in 1963.

Program 
Members are actively involved in national construction and community development projects. They have constructed schools, improved roads, planted trees and conducted literacy campaigns.

A scout is called Askuti in Berber.

The Scout emblem incorporates elements and color scheme of the flag of Algeria. It also has the crescent of Islam.

References

External links 
 

Youth organisations based in Algeria
World Organization of the Scout Movement member organizations
Youth organizations established in 1935